HMS Belfast is a Town-class light cruiser that was built for the Royal Navy. She is now permanently moored as a museum ship on the River Thames in London and is operated by the Imperial War Museum.

Construction of Belfast, the first ship in the Royal Navy to be named after the capital city of Northern Ireland and one of ten Town-class cruisers, began in December 1936. She was launched on St Patrick's Day 1938. Commissioned in early August 1939 shortly before the outbreak of the Second World War, Belfast was initially part of the British naval blockade against Germany. In November 1939, Belfast struck a German mine and, in spite of fears that she would be scrapped, spent more than two years undergoing extensive repairs. Belfast returned to action in November 1942 with improved firepower, radar equipment, and armour. Belfast saw action escorting Arctic convoys to the Soviet Union during 1943 and in December 1943 played an important role in the Battle of North Cape, assisting in the destruction of the German warship . In June 1944, Belfast took part in Operation Overlord supporting the Normandy landings. In June 1945, she was redeployed to the Far East to join the British Pacific Fleet, arriving shortly before the end of the Second World War. Belfast saw further combat action in  during the Korean War and underwent an extensive modernisation between 1956 and 1959. A number of further overseas commissions followed before she entered reserve in 1963.

In 1967, efforts were initiated to avert Belfast expected scrapping and to preserve her as a museum ship. A joint committee of the Imperial War Museum, the National Maritime Museum, and the Ministry of Defence was established and then reported in June 1968 that preservation was practical. In 1971, however, the government decided against preservation, prompting the formation of the private HMS Belfast Trust to campaign for her preservation. The efforts of the Trust were successful, and the government transferred the ship to the Trust in July 1971. Brought to London, she was moored on the River Thames near Tower Bridge in the Pool of London. Opened to the public in October 1971, Belfast became a branch of the Imperial War Museum in 1978. A popular tourist attraction, Belfast received over 327,000 visitors in 2019. As a branch of a national museum and part of the National Historic Fleet, Belfast is supported by the Department for Culture, Media and Sport, admissions income, and the museum's commercial activities.

Design

Belfast is a cruiser of the third Town class. The Town class had originated in 1933 as the Admiralty's response to the Imperial Japanese Navy's , an -ton cruiser mounting fifteen  guns with a top speed exceeding . Seaplanes carried aboard would enable shipping lanes to be patrolled over a wide area, and the class was also to be capable of its own anti-aircraft defence. Under the Director of Naval Construction the new design evolved during 1933. The lead ship of the new class, the 9,100-ton , and her sister , were ordered under the 1933 estimates. Three more cruisers were built to this design, with a further three ships built to a slightly larger 9,400-ton design in 1935–36. By 1935, however, the Admiralty was keen to improve the firepower of these cruisers to match the firepower of the Japanese Mogami and American s; both were armed with fifteen 6-inch guns. The Admiralty rejected a design featuring five triple turrets as impractical, while an alternative design fitting four quadruple turrets was rejected as an effective quadruple turret could not be developed. In May 1936 the Admiralty decided to fit triple turrets, whose improved design would permit an increase in deck armour. This modified design became the 10,000-ton Edinburgh subclass, named after Belfasts sister ship . Belfast was ordered from Harland and Wolff on 21 September 1936, and her keel laid on 10 December 1936. Her expected cost was £2,141,514; of which the guns cost £75,000 and the aircraft (two Supermarine Walruses) £66,500. She was launched on Saint Patrick's Day, 17 March 1938, by Anne Chamberlain, the wife of Prime Minister Neville Chamberlain. The launch was filmed by Pathé News. From March to August 1939, Belfast was fitted out and underwent sea trials.

She was propelled by four three-drum oil-fired Admiralty water-tube boilers, turning Parsons geared steam turbines, driving four propeller shafts.

Belfasts main armament comprised twelve Mk XXIII 6-inch guns in four triple turrets directed by an Admiralty Fire Control Table. With a rate of fire of up to eight rounds per gun per minute, her main battery was capable of a total maximum rate of fire of 96 rounds per minute. Her secondary armament comprised twelve 4-inch guns in six twin mounts. Her initial close-range anti-aircraft armament was sixteen 2-pounder "pom-pom" guns in two eight-barrel mountings, and two quadruple Vickers .50 machine guns. She also mounted six Mk IV 21-inch torpedo tubes in two triple mounts, and fifteen Mk VII depth charges.

Belfasts aviation capability was provided by two catapult-launched Supermarine Walrus amphibious biplanes. These could be launched from a D1H catapult mounted aft of the forward superstructure, and recovered from the water by two cranes mounted on either side of the forward funnel. The aircraft, operated by the Fleet Air Arm's HMS Belfast Flight of 700 Naval Air Squadron, were stowed in two hangars in the forward superstructure.

Second World War

1939–1942: Commissioning, prize capture, mining, and repairs
Belfast departed for Portsmouth on 3 August 1939, and was commissioned on 5 August 1939, less than a month before the outbreak of the Second World War. Her first captain was Captain G A Scott with a crew of 761, and her first assignment was to the Home Fleet's 2nd Cruiser Squadron. On 14 August, Belfast took part in her first exercise, Operation Hipper, in which she played the role of a German commerce raider attempting to escape into the Atlantic. By navigating the hazardous Pentland Firth, Belfast successfully evaded the Home Fleet.

On 31 August 1939 Belfast was transferred to the 18th Cruiser Squadron. Based at Scapa Flow in the Orkney islands, 18th Cruiser Squadron was part of the British effort to impose a naval blockade on Germany. Germany invaded Poland the following day, and Britain and France declared war on 3 September. At 11:40 that morning, Belfast received the message ‘Commence hostilities at once against Germany’. In particular, they were to search for the Norddeutscher Lloyd liner . No enemy vessels were found. On 25 September, Belfast took part in a fleet operation to recover the submarine , during which the ship was attacked by German aircraft, but suffered no damage. On 1 October 1939 Belfast left Scapa Flow for a patrol in the North Sea. On 5 October Belfast intercepted and boarded a neutral Norwegian factory ship that was sailing in company with six whaling ships. On 8 October the ship sighted the Swedish merchant ship C. P. Lilljevach but, in poor weather, did not intercept or board her. The following day she boarded Tai Yin, a Norwegian ship. Tai Yin had been listed by the Admiralty as suspicious, so a prize crew from Belfast sailed her to Kirkwall for investigation. Disguised as a neutral Swedish vessel, SS Ancona, Cap Norte was attempting to return to Germany from Brazil; her passengers included German reservists. Under the Admiralty's prize rules, Belfasts crew later received prize money. On 12 October Belfast boarded the Swedish ship Uddeholm, which was also sailed to Kirkwall by a prize crew. Returning to harbour, on the night of 13–14 October, Belfast was among the few ships anchored in Scapa Flow, following intelligence reports of an expected air raid. That night, the battleship  was torpedoed by German submarine , which had infiltrated the anchorage. On the morning following the sinking, Belfast left for Loch Ewe.

On 10 November Belfast was taken off the northern patrol and reassigned to the 2nd Cruiser Squadron. This squadron was to form an independent striking force based at Rosyth. On 21 November, Belfast was to take part in the force's first sortie, a gunnery exercise. At 10:58 am she detonated a magnetic mine while leaving the Firth of Forth. The mine broke Belfasts keel, and wrecked one of her engine and boiler rooms. Twenty officers and men required hospital treatment for injuries caused by the explosion, and a further 26 suffered minor injuries. One man, Painter 2nd Class Henry Stanton, was hospitalised but later died of a head injury, having been thrown against the deckhead by the blast. The tugboat Krooman, towing gunnery targets for the exercise, released her targets and instead towed Belfast to Rosyth for initial repairs.

Initial assessments of Belfasts damage showed that, while the mine had done little direct damage to the outer hull, causing only a small hole directly below one of the boiler rooms, the shock of the explosion had caused severe warping, breaking machinery, deforming the decks and causing the keel to hog (bend upwards) by three inches. On 4 January 1940 Belfast was decommissioned to Care and Maintenance status, becoming the responsibility of Rosyth Dockyard, and her crew dispersed to other vessels. By 28 June she had been repaired sufficiently to sail to Devonport, arriving on 30 June under the command of Lt Cdr H W Parkinson.

During her repairs, work was carried out to straighten, reconstruct and strengthen her hull. Her armour belt was also extended and thickened. Her armament was updated with newer 2-pounder pom-pom mountings, and her anti-aircraft armament improved with eighteen 20 mm Oerlikon guns in five twin and eight single mountings, replacing two quadruple 0.5-inch Vickers guns. Belfast also received new fire control radars for her main, secondary and anti-aircraft guns. Her November 1942 radar fit included one Type 284 set and four Type 283 sets to direct the main armament, three Type 285 sets for the secondary guns, and two Type 282 sets for the 2-pounder anti-aircraft guns. She also received a Type 273 general surface warning radar, Type 251 and 252 sets for identification friend or foe (IFF) purposes, and a Type 281 and Type 242 for air warning. Her 1942 electronics suite also included a Type 270 echosounder. Due to her increased topweight, a bulge was introduced into her hull amidships to improve stability and provide extra longitudinal strength. Her displacement had risen to  tons.

1942–1943: Recommissioning, Arctic convoys and Battle of North Cape

Belfast was recommissioned at Devonport on 3 November 1942, under the command of Captain Frederick Parham. On her return to the Home Fleet Belfast was made flagship of the 10th Cruiser Squadron, flying the flag of Rear-Admiral Robert Burnett, who had previously commanded the Home Fleet's destroyer flotillas. The squadron was responsible for the hazardous task of escorting Arctic convoys to the Soviet Union, operating from Scapa Flow and bases in Iceland. Her radar suite reduced Belfast need for aerial surveillance, and her aircraft were disembarked in June 1943. Belfast spent 1943 engaged on convoy escort and blockade patrol duties, and on 5–6 October of the same year, formed part of the covering force during Operation Leader, an airstrike against German shipping in the waters of northern Norway near Bodø by the aircraft carrier .

On 26 December 1943, Belfast participated in the Battle of North Cape. This battle, which occurred during the Arctic night, involved two strong Royal Navy formations; the first, Force One, comprised the cruisers ,  and Belfast (the 10th Cruiser Squadron) with three destroyers, and the second, Force Two, comprised the battleship  and the cruiser  with four destroyers. On 25 December 1943, Christmas Day, Nazi Germany's   left port in northern Norway to attack Convoy JW55B, which was bound for the Soviet Union. The next day Force One encountered Scharnhorst, prevented her from attacking the convoy, and forced her to retreat after being damaged by the British cruisers. As Scharnhorst attacked again at noon she was intercepted by Force Two and sunk by the combined formations. Belfast played an important role in the battle; as flagship of the 10th Cruiser Squadron, she was among the first to encounter Scharnhorst, and coordinated the squadron's defence of the convoy. After Scharnhorst turned away from the convoy, Admiral Burnett in Belfast shadowed her by radar from outside visual range, enabling her interception by Duke of York.

1944: Tirpitz and D-Day
After North Cape, Belfast refuelled at Kola Inlet before sailing for the United Kingdom, arriving at Scapa to replenish her fuel, ammunition and stores on New Year's Day 1944. Belfast sailed to Rosyth on 10 January, where her crew received a period of leave. February 1944 saw Belfast resume her Arctic convoy duties, and on 30 March 1944 Belfast sailed with the covering force of Operation Tungsten, a large carrier-launched Fleet Air Arm airstrike against the German battleship . Moored in Altafjord in northern Norway, Tirpitz was the German navy's last surviving capital ship. Launched on 3 April, the bombers scored fourteen hits, immobilising Tirpitz for two months, with one Barracuda shot down. Belfast underwent minor repairs at Rosyth from 23 April to 8 May, while her crew received a period of leave. On 8 May Belfast returned to Scapa Flow and carried the King during his pre-invasion visit to the Home Fleet.

For the invasion of Normandy Belfast was made headquarters ship of Bombardment Force E flying the flag of Rear-Admiral Frederick Dalrymple-Hamilton, and was to support landings by British and Canadian forces in the Gold and Juno Beach sectors. On 2 June Belfast left the River Clyde for her bombardment areas. That morning Prime Minister Winston Churchill had announced his intention to go to sea with the fleet and witness the invasion from HMS Belfast. This was opposed by the Supreme Allied Commander, General Dwight D. Eisenhower, and the First Sea Lord, Sir Andrew Cunningham. An intervention by the King eventually prevented Churchill from going.

The invasion was to begin on 5 June but bad weather forced a 24-hour delay. At 5:30 am on 6 June, Belfast opened fire on a German artillery battery at Ver-sur-Mer, suppressing the guns until the site was overrun by British infantry of 7th Battalion, Green Howards. On 12 June Belfast supported Canadian troops moving inland from Juno Beach and returned to Portsmouth on 16 June to replenish her ammunition. She returned two days later for further bombardments. On the night of 6 July Belfast was threatened at anchor by German motor torpedo boats ("E-boats"). She evaded them by weighing anchor and moving to the concealment of a smoke screen. Belfast fired her last round in anger in European waters on 8 July, in company with the monitor  and the battleship , as part of Operation Charnwood. On 10 July she sailed for Scapa, the fighting in France having moved inland beyond the range of her guns. During her five weeks off Normandy, Belfast had fired 1,996 rounds from her six-inch guns.

1945: Service in the Far East
On 29 July 1944, Captain Parham handed over command of HMS Belfast to Captain R M Dick, and until April 1945 Belfast underwent a refit to prepare for service against Japan in the Far East which improved her accommodation for tropical conditions, and updated her anti-aircraft armament and fire control in order to counter expected kamikaze attacks by Japanese aircraft. By May 1945, Belfast mounted thirty-six 2-pounder guns in two eight-gun mounts, four quadruple mounts, and four single mounts. She also mounted fourteen 20 mm Oerlikons. Her two aftmost 4-inch mountings were removed, and the remainder fitted with Remote Power Control. Her empty hangars were converted to crew accommodation, and her aircraft catapult was removed.

Her radar fit now included a Type 277 radar set to replace her Type 273 for surface warning. Her Type 281 air warning set was replaced by a single-antenna Type 281B set, while a Type 293Q was fitted for close-range height-finding and surface warning. A Type 274 set was fitted for main armament fire direction. On 17 June 1945, with the war in Europe at an end, Belfast sailed for the Far East via Gibraltar, Malta, Alexandria, Port Said, Aden, Colombo and Sydney. By the time she arrived in Sydney on 7 August Belfast had been made flagship of the 2nd Cruiser Squadron of the British Pacific Fleet. While in Sydney Belfast underwent another short refit, supplementing her close-range armament with five 40 mm Bofors guns. Belfast had been expected to join in Operation Downfall, but this was forestalled by the Japanese surrender on 15 August 1945.

Post-war service 19451950

With the end of the war, Belfast remained in the Far East, conducting a number of cruises to ports in Japan, China and Malaya and sailing for Portsmouth on 20 August 1947. There she paid off into reserve, and underwent a refit during which her turbines were opened for maintenance. She also received two more single Bofors guns, in place of two of her single 2-pounder mountings. She was recommissioned on 22 September 1948 and, before returning to the Far East, visited her home city of Belfast, arriving on 20 October. The following day, 21 October 1948, the ship's company marked Trafalgar Day with a march through the city. The next day Belfast took charge of a silver ship's bell, a gift of the people of Belfast. She sailed for Hong Kong on 23 October to join the Royal Navy's Far East Fleet, arriving in late December. By 1949, the political situation in China was precarious, with the Chinese Civil War moving towards its conclusion. As flagship of the 5th Cruiser Squadron, Belfast was the Far Eastern Station's headquarters ship during the April 1949 Amethyst Incident, in which a British sloop, was trapped in the Yangtze River by the communist People's Liberation Army. Belfast remained in Hong Kong during 1949, sailing for Singapore on 18 January 1950. There she underwent a minor refit between January to March 1950 and in June she joined the Far East Fleet's summer cruise. On 25 June 1950, while Belfast was visiting Hakodate in Japan, North Korean forces crossed the 38th Parallel, starting the Korean War.

Korean War 19501952

With the outbreak of the Korean War, Belfast became part of the United Nations naval forces. Originally part of the US Navy's Task Force 77, Belfast was detached in order to operate independently on 5 July 1950. During July and early August 1950, Belfast undertook coastal patrols and was based at Sasebo in Japan's Nagasaki Prefecture. That day Belfast fired an accurate 350-round bombardment from her 6-inch guns, and was praised by an American admiral as a "straight-shooting ship". On 6 August she sailed for the UK for a short (but needed) refit, after which she again set sail for the far east and arrived back at Sasebo on 31 January 1951.

During 1951 Belfast mounted a number of coastal patrols and bombarded a variety of targets. On 1 June she arrived at Singapore for refitting, arriving back on patrol on 31 August. In September 1951 Belfast provided anti-aircraft cover for a salvage operation to recover a crashed enemy MiG-15 jet fighter. She conducted further bombardments and patrols before receiving a month's leave from operations, returning to action on 23 December.

In 1952 Belfast continued her coastal patrol duties. On 29 July 1952 Belfast was hit by enemy fire while engaging an artillery battery on Wolsa-ri island. A 75 mm shell struck a forward compartment, killing a British sailor of Chinese origin in his hammock and wounding four other Chinese ratings. This was the only time Belfast was hit by enemy fire during her Korean service. On 27 September 1952 Belfast was relieved by two other Town-class cruisers,  and HMS Newcastle, and sailed back to the UK. She paid off in Chatham on 4 November 1952 and entered reserve at Devonport on 1 December.

Modernisation and final commissions 1955–1963

In reserve, Belfasts future was uncertain: post-war defence cuts made manpower-intensive cruisers excessively costly to operate, and it was not until March 1955 that the decision was taken to modernise Belfast. Work began on 6 January 1956. Although described as only an extended refit, the cost of £5.5 million was substantial for this large middle-aged cruiser.  Changes included: providing the new twin MK 5 40 mm and the twin 4-inch mount with individual MRS8 directors; the 4-inch guns training and elevation speed was increased to 20 degrees a second; and protecting key parts of the ship against nuclear, biological or chemical attack. This last consideration meant significantly enlarging and enclosing her bridge, creating a two-tiered, five-sided superstructure which radically altered her appearance. The most significant change was better accommodations for a smaller crew more fitting of post-war needs, her tripod masts replaced with lattice masts, and timber decking replaced with steel everywhere except the quarterdeck. The overall effect was to create a cruiser significantly more habitable but different internally and to a degree in external appearance, from wartime cruisers but still essentially a surface warfare, 'anti Sverdlov' cruiser, with anti-aircraft defence, updated only for point defence, with 262 radar, locking only  out. Belfast recommissioned at Devonport on 12 May 1959. Her close-range armament was standardised to six twin Bofors guns, and her close-range fire direction similarly standardised to eight close-range blind fire directors fitted with Type 262 radar. Her 1959 radar fit included two Type 274, lock and follow radar directors, for main armament direction, against sea and land targets, (other 1950s cruiser reconstructions of three Town cruisers and HMS Newfoundland and HMS Ceylon, had only a single main 274 director, limiting their surface effectiveness) Type 277Q and 293Q for height-finding and surface warning, Type 960M for air warning, and 974 for surface warning. In order to save weight, her torpedo armament was removed. Modern passive sonar type 174, 176 was installed and noise-reducing rubber insulation fitted to the propeller shaft.

Belfast arrived in Singapore on 16 December 1959, and spent most of 1960 at sea on exercise, calling at ports in Hong Kong, Borneo, India, Ceylon (now Sri Lanka), Australia, the Philippines and Japan. On 31 January 1961, Belfast recommissioned, under the command of Captain Morgan Morgan-Giles. On her final foreign commission Belfast joined a number of exercises in the Far East, and in December 1961 she provided the British guard of honour at Tanganyika's independence ceremony in Dar-es-Salaam.

In 1961 plans were drawn up for the conversion of Belfast to a hybrid helicopter cruiser for amphibious operations. The two aft 6-inch turrets would be removed to accommodate a helicopter deck and two hangars, capable of housing four Westland Wessex helicopters, while the 4-inch guns would be replaced by davits for four LCA landing craft. Only one of the ship's two boiler rooms would be used, which together with the reductions in armament would allow the ship's crew to be reduced, freeing up space to carry troops. Two infantry companies, 30 officers and 230 other ranks would be carried. The plan was rejected in December 1961, as the time required to carry out the conversions was too great.

The ship left Singapore on 26 March 1962 for the UK, sailing east via Hong Kong, Guam and Pearl Harbor, San Francisco, Seattle, British Columbia, Panama and Trinidad. She arrived at Portsmouth on 19 June 1962.

Recommissioned in July, she made a final visit to Belfast from 23–29 November, before paying off into reserve on 25 February 1963. In July 1963 Belfast was recommissioned for the last time, with a crew of the Royal Naval Reserve (RNR) and a number of Sea Cadets flying the flag of the Admiral Commanding Reserves, Rear Admiral Hugh Martell. Belfast sailed for Gibraltar in company with sixteen RNR minesweepers for a two-week exercise in the Mediterranean on 10 August. Martell's obituarist considered this commission a well-judged contrivance which 'did much to restore the confidence and image of the new RNR' which had undergone an acrimonious amalgamation with the Royal Navy Volunteer Reserve in 1958.

Reserve, decommissioning, and preservation efforts 1963–1971
Belfast returned to Devonport on 24 August 1963 and underwent a short refit to prepare her for paying off into reserve, which occurred in December 1963. In January 1966 parts of the ship and power systems were reactivated and from May 1966 to 1970 she served as an accommodation ship (taking over those duties from Sheffield), moored in Fareham Creek, for the Reserve Division at Portsmouth. While Belfast lay at Fareham Creek the Imperial War Museum, Britain's national museum of twentieth-century conflict, became interested in preserving a 6-inch turret. The turret would represent a number of classes of cruiser (then disappearing from service) and would complement the museum's pair of British 15-inch naval guns. On 14 April 1967 museum staff visited , a  also moored in Fareham Creek at the time. Following the visit the possibility was raised of preserving an entire ship. Gambia had already severely deteriorated, so attention turned to the possibility of saving Belfast. The Imperial War Museum, the National Maritime Museum and the Ministry of Defence established a joint committee, which reported in June 1968 that the scheme was practical and economic. However, in early 1971 the government's Paymaster General decided against preservation. On 4 May 1971 Belfast was "reduced to disposal" to await scrapping.

HMS Belfast Trust 1971–1977

Following the government's refusal, a private trust was formed to campaign for the ship's preservation. The Belfast Trust was established; its chairman was Rear-Admiral Sir Morgan Morgan-Giles, captain of Belfast from January 1961 to July 1962. As Member of Parliament (MP) for Winchester, Morgan-Giles addressed the House of Commons on 8 March 1971. He described Belfast as being in "a really wonderful state of preservation" and that saving her for the nation represented a "case of grasping the last opportunity". Among the MPs who spoke in support of Morgan-Giles was Gordon Bagier, MP for Sunderland South, who served as a Royal Marine gunner aboard Belfast and was present at both the sinking of Scharnhorst and the Normandy landings. Speaking for the government, the Under-secretary for the Navy, Peter Kirk, said that Belfast was "one of the most historic ships which the Navy has had in the last 20 years", but that he could not prevent the stripping of the ship's removable equipment, as this was already too far advanced to be halted. He did, however, agree to postpone any decision on the scrapping of Belfast to allow the Trust to put together a formal proposal.

Following the Trust's efforts, the government agreed to hand over Belfast to the Trustees in July 1971, with Vice Admiral Sir Donald Gibson as her first director. At a press conference in August the Trust announced "Operation Seahorse", the plan to bring Belfast to London. She was towed from Portsmouth to London via Tilbury, where she was fitted out as a museum. She was towed to her berth above Tower Bridge on 15 October 1971 and settled in a huge hole that had been dredged in the river bed; then she was attached to two dolphins which guide her during the rise and fall of the tide.

She was opened to the public on Trafalgar Day, 21 October 1971. The date was significant, as Belfast was the first naval vessel to be saved for the nation since , Lord Nelson's flagship at the Battle of Trafalgar. Though no longer part of the Royal Navy, HMS Belfast was granted a special dispensation to allow her to continue to fly the White Ensign.

Now a museum, the ship's opening was well received: in 1972 the HMS Belfast Trust won the British Tourist Authority's "Come to Britain" trophy. Support for the ship's restoration was received from individuals, from the Royal Navy, and from commercial businesses; in 1973, for example, the Worshipful Company of Bakers provided dummy bread for display in the ship's NAAFI and bakery. By 1974, areas including the Admiral's bridge and forward boiler and engine rooms had been restored and fitted out. By December 1975 Belfast had received 1,500,000 visitors. In 1976 Belfast was reaffiliated with the successors to the British Army's Royal Ulster Rifles, the Royal Irish Rangers, and in the same year the Royal Naval Amateur Radio Society restored the ship's Bridge Wireless Office to working order.

Imperial War Museum 1978–present
By 1977, the financial position of the HMS Belfast Trust had become marginal, and the Imperial War Museum sought permission to merge the Trust into the museum. On 19 January 1978 the Secretary of State for Education and Science, Shirley Williams, accepted the proposal stating that HMS Belfast "is a unique demonstration of an important phase of our history and technology". The ship was transferred to the museum on 1 March 1978, and became the Imperial War Museum's third branch, Duxford aerodrome having been acquired in 1976. In October 1998, the HMS Belfast Association was formed to reunite former members of the ship's company. The Imperial War Museum's Sound Archive also seeks to record oral history interviews with former crewmen.

Preservation

Since being brought to London Belfast has twice been drydocked as part of the ship's long-term preservation. In 1982 she was docked at Tilbury, and in June 1999 Belfast was towed to Portsmouth. This was the first time she had been to sea in 28 years and thus required a Certificate of Seaworthiness from the Maritime and Coastguard Agency. While in dock, her entire hull was cleaned, blasted, and repainted, her hull blanking plates inspected and an ultrasonic survey carried out. She was not expected to require further drydocking until 2020. While under tow to Portsmouth she was delayed by bad weather and arrived a day late: it had been intended that she would arrive on 6 June 1999, the fifty-fifth anniversary of the Normandy landings. During the maintenance work, Belfast hull and topsides were repainted in her specific camouflage scheme officially known as Admiralty Disruptive Camouflage Type 25, which she had worn from November 1942 to July 1944. This was objected to by some, due to the anachronistic conflict between her camouflage, which reflects the majority of her active Second World War service, and her present configuration, which was the result of the ship's extended refit from January 1956 to May 1959. With the establishment of the Department for Culture, Media and Sport's (DCMS) Advisory Committee on National Historic Ships in 2006, Belfast was listed as part of the National Historic Fleet.

On 9 May 2010, a ceremony was held aboard Belfast to mark the 65th anniversary of end of the Second World War in Europe. Veterans of the Arctic convoys were in attendance to receive medals from the Russian Ambassador Yuri Fedotov. During the ceremony it was announced that, as part of the restoration of the ship, two new masts had been manufactured at the Severnaya Verf shipyard near Saint Petersburg. The production of the masts, to replace corroded originals, had been supported by a number of Russian businesses at a reported cost of £500,000. The restoration of the masts involved removing the fittings from both masts, allowing them to be individually restored. The old masts were then cut down in sections, the new masts erected, and the original fittings replaced. On 19 October 2010, the new masts were dedicated at a ceremony attended by HMS Belfast veterans, by Prince Philip and officials from the Russian embassy and government.

In 2017, it was announced that the third of the Royal Navy's Type 26 frigates would be named Belfast. At the same time, the IWM stated that the museum would be renamed as "HMS Belfast (1938)" as a means of avoiding confusion.

Interpretation

When Belfast was first opened to the public, visitors were limited to the upper decks and forward superstructure. As of 2011, nine decks are open to the public. Access to the ship is via a walkway which connects the quarterdeck with the pedestrianised footpath on the south bank of the River Thames. The Imperial War Museum's guidebook to HMS Belfast divides the ship into three broad sections. The first of these, "Life on board the ship", focuses on the experience of serving at sea. Restored compartments, some populated with dressed figures, illustrate the crew's living conditions and the ship's various facilities such as the sick bay, galley, laundry, chapel, mess decks and NAAFI. Since 2002, school and youth groups have been able to stay onboard Belfast overnight, sleeping in bunks on a restored 1950s mess deck.

The second section, "The inner workings", below the waterline and protected by the ship's armoured belt, contains core mechanical, electrical and communication systems. As well as the engine and boiler rooms, other compartments include the transmitting station (housing the ship's Admiralty Fire Control Table, a mechanical computer), the forward steering position and one of Belfasts six-inch shell rooms and magazines. The third section, "Action stations", includes the upper deck and forward superstructure with the ship's armament, fire control, and command facilities. Areas open to the public include the operations room, Admiral's bridge and gun direction platform. During 2011, two of these areas were reinterpreted. The operations room was restored to its appearance during Exercise Pony Express, a large British-Australian-American joint exercise held off North Borneo in 1961. The reinterpretation included an interactive audio-visual plotting table. 

In July 2011, the interior of Y Turret, the aftmost 6-inch turret, was redisplayed using audio-visual and atmospheric effects, seeking to evoke the experience of a gunner at the Battle of North Cape. A 4-inch gun mount and a shell hoist are kept in working order and used during blank-firing demonstrations by the Wavy Navy re-enactment group. In addition to the various areas of the ship open to visitors, some compartments have been fitted out as dedicated exhibition space. Permanent exhibitions include "HMS Belfast in War and Peace" and "Life at Sea". The cost of admission to HMS Belfast includes a multilingual audio guide.

HMS Belfast also serves as the headquarters of the City of London Sea Cadet Corps, and her prestigious location in central London as a result means she frequently has other vessels berthed alongside. In October 2007, Belfast hosted the naming ceremony of the lighthouse tender  with the Queen and Prince Philip in attendance.

2011 accident
On 29 November 2011, two workmen suffered minor injuries after a section of gangway, connected to the ship, collapsed during renovation works. The ship was closed to visitors following the accident. An investigation later established that the collapse of the gangway had been caused by a subcontractor cutting through the gangway's structure during refurbishment work. Belfast re-opened on 18 May 2012.

The closure delayed the construction of a new two-storey bank-side pavilion to replace Belfasts existing retail and admissions building. The structure, for which planning permission was received in October 2011, provides a ground floor café, shop and admissions area, and a rooftop bar. Initially expected to be complete by summer 2012, the pavilion opened in April 2013.

Notes

References

Bibliography

External links

 
 

Town-class cruisers (1936)
Ships built in Belfast
1938 ships
World War II cruisers of the United Kingdom
Cold War cruisers of the United Kingdom
Korean War cruisers of the United Kingdom
Museums established in 1971
Museum ships in the United Kingdom
Museums sponsored by the Department for Digital, Culture, Media and Sport
Museums in the London Borough of Southwark
Museums on the River Thames
Ships and vessels of the National Historic Fleet
Naval museums in London
Imperial War Museum
Collection of the Imperial War Museum
Ships built by Harland and Wolff
Articles containing video clips
Maritime incidents in November 1939